Spaceline may refer to:

 Spaceline (band)
 An organization in the space tourism industry, such as Space Adventures and Virgin Galactic
 Karman line, the line demarcating the start of space, from the ground, at 100km, as defined by the FAI.

See also

 
 
 
 
 Spaceliner (disambiguation)
 Starline (disambiguation)
 Space (disambiguation)
 Line (disambiguation)